Quita Mould  is an archaeologist, specialising in small finds and the identification of leather.

Biography
Mould has a BA in Archaeology and Geography from Southampton University and an MA in Archaeology from the Institute of Archaeology. Mould has contributed to numerous small finds reports and analysis from Roman, Early-Medieval, and Medieval sites. She was one of the principal authors of the Historic England guidance on "Waterlogged Organic Artefacts". She was elected as a Fellow of the Society of Antiquaries of London on 1 January 2005.

Mould is the secretary of the Archaeological Leather Group and the Membership Secretary of the Finds Research Group.

Select publications
Volken, M., Mould, Q., and Cameron, E. 2020. "A reassessment of leatherwork from the Sutton Hoo Ship Burial", Antiquaries Journal 
Keiley, J. and Mould, Q. 2017. "Leatherworking in South-Eastern Britain in the Roman Period", in Bird, D. (ed). Agriculture and Industry in South-Eastern Roman Britain. Oxford, Oxbow. 236–254
Mould, Q. and Cameron, E. 2016. "The animal pelt", in Jones, A.M., Preserved in the Peat: An extraordinary Bronze Age burial on Whitehorse Hill, Dartmoor, and its wider context. Oxford, Oxbow Books. 64–68
Thompson, R. and Mould, Q. (eds) 2011. Leather Tanneries: the archaeological evidence. London: Archetype
Mould, Q. 2011. "Devil's Crafts and Dragon's Skins? Sheaths, Shoes and Other Leatherwork", in Clegg Hyer, M. and Owen-Crocker, G. R. (eds) The Material Culture of Daily Living in the Anglo-Saxon World. University of Exeter Press, 93–115
Mould, Q. 2011. "Domestic life", in Allason-Jones, L. (ed.) Artefacts in Roman Britain, Cambridge, Cambridge University Press, 153–79
Mould, Q. 2009. "The Roman Shoes" and "The Medieval Leather", in Howard-Davis, C. The Carlisle Millennium Project excavations in Carlisle, 1998–2001. Volume 2: The Finds. Oxford, Oxford Archaeology North, 831–857

References

Living people
Fellows of the Society of Antiquaries of London
Alumni of the University of Southampton
Alumni of University College London
British women archaeologists
Year of birth missing (living people)